This list contains the list of the associate justices of the Supreme Court of the Philippines from 1901.

List in chronological order

Demographics

Age

By gender

By appointing president

References

See also 
 Supreme Court of the Philippines
 Chief Justice of the Supreme Court of the Philippines
 Associate Justice of the Supreme Court of the Philippines
 Court of Appeals of the Philippines
 Court of Tax Appeals of the Philippines
 Sandiganbayan
 Constitution of the Philippines

Justices of the Supreme Court of the Philippines
Philippines